Our Lady of Mount Carmel's Church may refer to:

 Our Lady of Mount Carmel's Church (Poughkeepsie, New York)
 Our Lady of Mount Carmel's Church (Bronx)